Mont-Tremblant International Airport  (officially La Macaza – Mont-Tremblant International and formerly Rivière Rouge – Mont-Tremblant International Airport) is a single runway airport located in the township of La Macaza,  north of the village, about  north of Mont-Tremblant, Quebec, Canada.

History

Military base
It became home to 447 SAM Squadron, armed with 29 nuclear tipped CIM-10 Bomarc missiles. After 1968 the station became CFB La Macaza and closed as an active base in 1972 following the removal of the Bomarc missiles.

Civilian airfield

It was converted to be a civilian airport, and then turned into an international airport in 2000 despite a referendum held in the region in which the citizens of La Macaza opposed the project. In December 2007, Continental Airlines began seasonal service to its Newark hub. The route operated at least until the winter of 2010–2011.

Federal prison
The area that was used for the Bomarc launchers was converted into the La Macaza Institution in 1978.

Facilities

The airport consists of a small chalet-style terminal building along the east side of the runway and south of the prison facility. There are no hangars for aircraft storage.

The airport is classified as an airport of entry by Nav Canada and is staffed by the Canada Border Services Agency (CBSA) on a call-out basis from the Mirabel Airport. CBSA officers at this airport can handle general aviation aircraft only, with no more than 15 passengers. 

The airport is about a 40-minute taxi ride from the resort at Mont Tremblant in good road conditions. It can take up to an hour in winter snow conditions as part of the road is secondary pavement with many twists and turns.

The airport is served during the ski season and summer months by Porter Airlines and between December and March by Air Canada.

Airlines and destinations

Ground transportation

The airport has shuttle buses running from the airport to the Mont Tremblant Resort.

Rental cars, taxis and limos are available for travel around Mont Tremblant International Airport.

Expansion plans

References

External links
Official site
Pinetree Line website with detailed information on CFS La Macaza

Certified airports in Laurentides